Barbara Metselaar Berthold is a German photographer and filmmaker.

Biography 
Berthold studied social psychology from 1969 to 1971 at the Friedrich-Schiller University Jena. In 1971 she began studying photography at the Academy of Visual Arts Leipzig, completing her degree in 1976 with a diploma. Then she went to Berlin, where she worked as a freelance photographer. In 1984 she married the Dutchman Kees Metselaar and traveled out of the GDR. In the years 1985 to 1989 she was a lecturer and artistic staff including work at the University of Arts in Berlin. Then she focused on the production of documentaries and video essays and worked from 1991 for various TV productions. In 1996 signed the International Festival for Documentary and Animated Film in Leipzig her film "We were so happy to have been heroes" with the Silver Dove. [1] 1998/99 was Barbara Merselaar Berthold and a lecturer in photography at the School of Film TV Babelsberg held. Their documentary projects have been supported by grants from the film enhance the country Mecklenburg-Vorpommern and cultural promotion in the Free State of Saxony. In 2010 she received the award for artistic photography of artists program of the Berlin Senate.
She lives in Berlin and the Uckermark.

Exhibitions 

 Fotowerkstatt Kreuzberg, Berlin 1985
 Stadtstand II, Installation mit Hans-Hendrik Grimmling, Lutz Friedel und Martin Steyer im Künstlerhaus Bethanien, Berlin, 1988
 DDR-Frauen fotografieren , Haus am Lützowplatz Berlin und im Museum Ludwig, Oberhausen 1990, mit Katalog: Gabriele Muschter, (Hrsg.): DDR Frauen fotografieren. Lexikon und Anthologie, ex pose verlag, Berlin 1990
 Citylights, Alter Wiehrebahnhof Freiburg 1991
 ,  1994
 In den großen Städten, Galerie argus Fotokunst, Berlin 1996
 Cut/Kire/Schnitt, Galerie Schwarzes Kloster Freiburg, 1998
 Frozen Margaritas, fotografische Installation in der Galerie am Prater, Berlin 1999
 Deutsche Tänze, Museum für zeitgenössische Kunst Cottbus, und im Haus am Kleistpark, Berlin-Schöneberg 1999
 Positions-Attidudes-Actions, Foto Biennale Rotterdam (Beteiligung), 2000
 Within and beyond the wall (Nine German photographers) Harbourfront Gallery Toronto, 2004
 Fifteen years after the fall of the wall (Beteiligung), Central Library Gallery San Antonio, 2004
 Utopie und Wirklichkeit, Forum für Fotografie Köln und Willy-Brandt-Haus Berlin (Beteiligung), 2004
 Behind Walls, Noorderlicht Photofestival (Beteiligung), Fries Museum, Leeuwarden, 2008
 Art of two Germanys, Los Angeles County Museum of Art (Beteiligung), 2009
 Suche, Seele, Suche - zwischen zwei Welten, Galerie argus Fotokunst, Berlin 2010
 Filetstücke - Vexierbilder Berlin Mitte, Ephraim-Palais, Berlin 2010
 4. Fotofestival, Mannheim Ludwigshafen Heidelberg 2011

Works in public collections 

Ihre Arbeiten sind unter anderen in folgenden Sammlungen enthalten:
 Los Angeles County Museum of Art (LACMA), Los Angeles
 Berlinische Galerie, Berlin
 Märkisches Museum, Berlin
 Fotografischen Sammlung des Kunstmuseum des Landes Sachsen-Anhalt auf der Moritzburg in Halle
 Museum für zeitgenössische Kunst Cottbus

Films 

 , Materialsammlung, (Regie, Kamera, Schnitt), 1989
  - die Klappe und Das Haus, künstlerische Videos, 1989/90
 Tell me the tales (Kamera), Deutscher Fernsehfunk 1991
  (Regiekamera, Schnitt), ZDF Kleines Fernsehspiel, 1993/94
  (Buch, Regie, Kamera, Schnitt) ZDF Kleines Fernsehspiel, 1995/96
 Frozen Margaritas (Buch, Regie, Kamera, Schnitt, Produktion), 1998/99
  (Buch, Regie, Kamera, Schnitt), 2005
  (Buch, Regie, Kamera, Schnitt), mit Tina Bara, 2006/07

Publications 

 Kratzen am Beton - 68er in der DDR?. Verlag Vopelius, Jena 2008, .
 Albatros. Vom Abheben, Lukas Verlag, Berlin 2010,

References 

http://www.argus-fotokunst.de/de/info/berthold.html

External links 
 
 
 Biographie Barbara Metselaar Berthold (Galerie argus fotokunst)
 Noorderlicht Photofestival 2008
 Bilder, die sie nicht mehr sehen wollte – Rezension der Ausstellung im Ephraim-Palais von Irmgard Berner in der Berliner Zeitung, 16. November 2010

1951 births
Living people
East German photographers
East German women
Photographers from Berlin